Sir George Armytage, 3rd Baronet (25 December 1734 – 21 January 1783) was a British politician.

He was the second son of Sir Samuel Armytage, 1st Baronet and his wife Anne Griffith, daughter of Thomas Griffith. In 1758, he succeeded his older brother John as baronet. Armytage was a Member of Parliament (MP) for York from 1761 to 1768. Between 1775 and 1776, he was High Sheriff of Yorkshire.

Armytage died aged 48 and was buried at Hartshead in Yorkshire.

Family
On 10 April 1760, Armytage married Anna Maria Wentworth, eldest daughter of Godfrey Wentworth at St Marylebone Church in London. They had three daughters and three sons, of whose George, the oldest succeeded to the baronetcy.

Godfrey Wentworth Wentworth (1773–1834), MP, third son of Sir George Armytage, 3rd Baronet, married in 1794 Amelia, daughter of Walter Ramsden Beaumont Fawkes  and sister of Walter Fawkes.

References

1734 births
1783 deaths
Baronets in the Baronetage of Great Britain
British MPs 1761–1768
High Sheriffs of Yorkshire
Members of the Parliament of Great Britain for English constituencies